Richard Peterson (9 March 1884 – 2 April 1967) was a Norwegian tennis player. He competed in two events at the 1912 Summer Olympics.

References

1884 births
1967 deaths
Norwegian male tennis players
Olympic tennis players of Norway
Tennis players at the 1912 Summer Olympics
Sportspeople from Oslo